Liu Bingjian (born October 16, 1963, in Anhui) is a Chinese film director who emerged on the cinema scene in the late 1990s with his LGBT-themed film Men and Women.

Career
Originally trained as a painter, Liu attended the prestigious Beijing Film Academy where he studied cinematography. Upon graduation, he switched to directing and worked in television before making his first film Inkstone which failed to be screened either in China or abroad.

In 1999, he directed the underground LGBT film Men and Women. Though the film was banned in China, it was seen as a rare example of a Chinese film to treat homosexuality as an everyday occurrence.

Liu followed up Men and Women with Cry Woman in 2002.

Like many of his colleagues, Liu Bingjian emerged from the underground scene with 2004's state-approved Plastic Flowers, starring actress Liu Xiaoqing in her first role in over a decade. The film premiered at the 2004 Toronto International Film Festival.

Filmography

References

External links 

 Liu Bingjian at the Chinese Movie Database

Film directors from Anhui
Beijing Film Academy alumni
1963 births
Living people
Chinese film directors